Sidi Ghiles (Arabic: سيدي غيلاس) Formerly Novi during the French colonization, is a town on Algeria's Mediterranean coast. The municipality of Novi is located about 32 kilometers (20 mi) west of Tipasa and 7 kilometers (4 mi) southwest of Cherchell. This agricultural locality is a hundred kilometers (62 mi) distant of Algiers.

Novi, renowned for its fertile soil, vineyards and wines, is located by the sea. It is a modern village
despite its traditionally typical so-called "colonization" villages with its well-traced streets, airy, lined with houses and villas resplendent with whiteness.

Novi agricultural colony, originally managed by the military authority, was founded by decree of the National Assembly of 19 September 1848 and by order of the Minister of War Louis Juchault de Lamoricière (1806-1865) on September 27 of the same year. It's one of the first 7 centers of colonization created in Algeria.

Names
After the independence of Algeria on July 5, 1962, the town of Novi became known as Sidi Ghiles.

History

Inhabitation
Located in the middle of charming vineyards of Algeria, and situated between the sea and mountains, Sidi Ghiles is one of the prettiest villages in the region.
The initial population of Novi was mainly made up of the political deportees of 1848, this center became an annex of Cherchell.

It was, then, a municipality that covered an area of 1647 hectares with a population of 1047 inhabitants including 423 French. Most of the other inhabitants were native Berbers indigenous to the surrounding hills and Atlas Mountains.

In 1903, Mayor Léon Roseau gave Novi a school group; in 1908 some owners grouped themselves to create a cooperative cellar of 5,000 hectares whose notoriety has crossed the borders of North Africa.

The Department
The department of Algiers is one of the French departments of Algeria, which existed between 1848 and 1962. Considered a French province, Algeria was departmentalized on December 9, 1848. The departments created in
this date was the civil zone of the three provinces corresponding to the Beyliks of the regency of Algiers recently conquered. Therefore, the city of Algiers was made prefecture of the department bearing its name, then covering the center of Algeria, leaving to the east the department of Constantine and to the west the department of Oran.

On January 28, 1956, an administrative reform to take account of the strong demographic growth experienced by the country, amputated the department of Algiers from its hinterland and thus creating May 20, 1957, three additional departments:
the department of Médéa, the department of Orleansville and the department of Tizi Ouzou.
The District of Cherchell, in the department of Orleansville, consisted of 8 localities:
Bouyamine - Cherchell - Genoa Fountain - Gouraya - Marceau (Menaceur) - Novi - Villbourg - Zurich (Sidi Amar).

The emigration
On August 11, 1962, 293 of the 300 Frenchmen of Novi left by boat for Marseille, under the protection of the French army.

References

Communes of Tipaza Province
Algeria